Athinaikos women's basketball is the women's professional basketball team of the Athens-based multi-sports club Athinaikos, that was founded in 1917. The team competes in the Greek Women's Basketball League.

History
Athinaikos has starred in the women's Greek League championship during recent years, winning four consecutive championships, and three consecutive women's Greek Cups. From 2008 to 2012, Athinaikos dominated exclusively, breaking the record of consecutive wins in the Greek League (105 wins). The success of Athinaikos entered the Guinness book of records. The club's most important moment was the conquest of the EuroCup during the 2009-10 season, which was the first cup won by any Greek club in women's basketball, in European-wide competitions.

Roster

Notable players
 Polymnia Saregkou
 Dimitra Kalentzou  
 Olga Chatzinikolaou  
 Chantelle Handy 
 Vera Perostiyska

Honours
EuroCup 
Winner (1): 2010
Greek League
Winner (4): 2009, 2010, 2011, 2012
 Greek Cup
Winner (3):  2010, 2011, 2012
Greek A2 Division: Champion (2007)
ESKA Division Champion: (2006)

References

External links
 Athinaikos Women's B.C. official website 

Women's basketball teams in Greece
EuroCup Women-winning clubs
Basketball teams in Athens
Athinaikos A.C.